The Gotham Independent Film Award for Best Actress was one of the annual Gotham Independent Film Awards awarded between 2013 and 2020. In 2021, it was replaced by the gender neutral awards for Outstanding Lead Performance and Outstanding Supporting Performance.

Winners and nominees

2010s

2020s

Multiple nominees
2 nominations
 Cate Blanchett
 Scarlett Johansson
 Brie Larson

See also

 Academy Award for Best Actress
 Critics' Choice Movie Award for Best Actress
 Independent Spirit Award for Best Female Lead
 BAFTA Award for Best Actress in a Leading Role
 Golden Globe Award for Best Actress – Motion Picture Drama
 Golden Globe Award for Best Actress – Motion Picture Musical or Comedy
 Screen Actors Guild Award for Outstanding Performance by a Female Actor in a Leading Role

References

Best Actress
Film awards for lead actress
Awards established in 2013
Awards disestablished in 2021